Hussain Seraj  is a Kuwaiti football forward who played for Kuwait in the 2004 Asian Cup. He also played for Al-Fahaheel FC.

External links
 
 

Kuwaiti footballers
1982 births
Living people
Association football forwards
Kuwait international footballers
Al-Sahel SC (Kuwait) players
Kuwait Premier League players
Al-Fahaheel FC players
Al-Shabab SC (Kuwait) players